The Genius of Coleman Hawkins is a 1957 album by tenor saxophonist Coleman Hawkins, featuring the Oscar Peterson quartet.

Track listing
 "I'll Never Be The Same" (Gus Kahn, Matty Malneck, Frank Signorelli) – 3:29
 "You're Blasé" (Ord Hamilton, Bruce Sievier) – 3:35
 "I Wished on the Moon" (Dorothy Parker, Ralph Rainger) – 3:38
 "How Long Has This Been Going On?" (George Gershwin, Ira Gershwin) – 3:54
 "Like Someone in Love" (Johnny Burke, Jimmy Van Heusen) – 3:55
 "My Melancholy Baby" (Ernie Burnett, George Norton) – 4:08
 "Ill Wind" (Harold Arlen, Ted Koehler) – 5:33
 "In a Mellow Tone" (Duke Ellington, Milt Gabler) – 4:45
 "There's No You" (Tom Adair, Hal Hopper) – 3:25
 "The World Is Waiting for the Sunrise" (Eugene Lockhart, Ernest Seitz) – 3:49
 "Somebody Loves Me" (G. Gershwin, Buddy DeSylva, Ballard MacDonald) – 3:51
 "Blues for Rene" (Coleman Hawkins) – 3:03
 Bonus tracks included on the 1997 CD release:
 "Begin the Beguine" (Cole Porter) – 3:02
 "I Never Had a Chance" (Irving Berlin) – 2:06
 "I Never Had a Chance" – 2:00
 "I Wished on the Moon" – 3:37
 "Like Someone in Love" – 3:55
 "Ill Wind" – 5:35
 "In a Mellow Tone" – 4:46
 "There's No You" – 3:26
 "Blues for Rene" – 3:04

Personnel

Performance
 Coleman Hawkins – tenor saxophone
 Oscar Peterson – piano
 Herb Ellis – guitar
 Ray Brown – double bass
 Alvin Stoller – drums

References

1957 albums
Coleman Hawkins albums
Albums produced by Norman Granz
Verve Records albums

Albums recorded at Capitol Studios